Gareth Shaun Smith (born 9 April 1971) is an English former footballer. Smith spent the majority of his career at Crewe Alexandra, playing in 399 League games and more than 400 overall.

The highlight of Smith's career came when he scored the winner for Crewe Alexandra in their 1-0 victory over Brentford in the 1997 Division Two play-off final. This took Crewe into the second tier of English football for the first time in around a century. He had also played in the 1993 Third division final at Wembley, which Crewe lost on penalties to York City. During the first division era Smith played mostly at left back for Crewe and was popular with the supporters despite never being a big star. He won the supporter's player of the year award in 2000–01. Smith eventually left Crewe in the summer of 2002 to join Hull City, where he scored once against Cambridge United, and a year later had two joint testimonial games (alongside fellow player Steve Macauley) at Crewe's Alexandra Stadium against Merseyside clubs Liverpool and Everton.

Honours
with Crewe Alexandra
Football League Second Division play-off final winner: 1997

References

External links

1971 births
Living people
Footballers from Leeds
English footballers
Association football defenders
Halifax Town A.F.C. players
Wakefield F.C. players
Crewe Alexandra F.C. players
Hull City A.F.C. players
Stockport County F.C. players
Carlisle United F.C. players
Rochdale A.F.C. players
York City F.C. players
English Football League players